Kwesi is a Ghanaian male given name. In the Ghanaian tradition of "day names", it refers to children born on a Sunday. Notable people with this name include:

 Kwesi Ahoomey-Zunu, Togolese politician
 Kwesi Ahwoi (born 1946), Ghanaian politician
 Kwesi Akomia Kyeremateng, Ghanaian politician
 Kwesi Akwansah Andam (1946–2007), Ghanaian academic
 Kwesi Amissah-Arthur (1951–2018), Ghanaian economist, academic and politician
 Kwesi Amoako Atta (born 1951), Ghanaian lawyer, management consultant and politician
 Kwesi Amoako-Atta (1920–1983), Ghanaian banker and politician
 Kwesi Appiah (born 1990), Ghanaian football player
 Kwesi Armah (1929–2006), Ghanaian politician and diplomat
 Kwesi Arthur (born 1994), Ghanaian musician
 Kwesi Boakye (born 1999), American actor, voice actor and singer
 Kwesi Botchwey (born 1944), Ghanaian politician
 Kwesi Brew (1928–2007), Ghanaian poet and diplomat
 Kwesi Browne (born 31 January 1994), Trinidad and Tobago male track cyclist, representing Trinidad and Tobago at competitions
 Kwesi Dickson (1929-2005), Ghanaian theologian
 Linton Kwesi Johnson (born 1952), Jamaican-British musician
 Kwesi Nyantakyi, Ghanaian banker
 Kwesi Owusu (born 1950s), Ghanaian author and filmmaker
 Kwesi Plange (1926–1953), Ghanaian politician
 Kwesi Prah (born 1942), Ghanaian author
 Kwesi Pratt Jnr (born 1953), Ghanaian journalist
 Kwesi Sinclair (born 1978), Guyanese cricket player
 Kwesi Slay (born 1990), Ghanaian hip hop artist
 Kwesi Wilson (died 2019)
 Kwesi Yankah, Ghanaian academic, author and university administrator